Honey Nway Oo (born 19 March 1999) is a Burmese former actress and current officer in the Student Armed Force (SAF). Initially working in acting, she openly opposed the Tatmadaw following the 2021 Myanmar coup d'état, and left her acting career to join the SAF; a warrant was issued for her arrest. Honey has been regarded as one of the most prominent revolutionaries in Myanmar and is often called the "people's girl" for her role in anti-coup movements.

Early life and education
Honey Nway Oo was born on 19 March 1999 in Yangon. She finished her primary and higher education in Yangon. She went on to study at Yangon University of Foreign Languages (YUFL), where she earned a B.A. (German) in 2020. She was picked as the "beauty queen" as a freshman at the university. In 2018, she founded the first YUFL football team and served as its captain.

Acting career
While studying German at YUFL, Honey began modelling for local magazines and music videos in 2019. She appeared in over 20 TV commercials and was a brand ambassador for Oppo. She made her acting debut in a main role in the 2020 film Yangon In Love. She participated in the non-profit organization Care Teen, which provides school supplies and health and education services to underprivileged children.

Rebel career 
In the aftermath of the 2021 Myanmar coup d'état, Honey organized anti-coup protests and left for the jungle. She, along with several other celebrities, was charged with calling for participation in the Civil Disobedience Movement (CDM), damaging the state's ability to govern, supporting the Committee Representing Pyidaungsu Hluttaw, and generally inciting the people to disturb the peace and stability of the nation. On 3 July 2021, military forces arrived at her family's home in Lanmadaw Township and posted a notice declaring that it had been confiscated by the junta. Honey later joined a resistance group, the Student Armed Force and is currently serving as a senior officer. During the military training graduation ceremony, she was given the SAF's marksmanship award.

References

External links
Exclusive Interview with People's Star Honey Nway Oo Burma VJ

1999 births
Living people
People from Yangon
Burmese revolutionaries
Burmese democracy activists
21st-century Burmese actresses